Thenkanikottai taluk, also known as Denkanikottai, is a taluk of Krishnagiri district of the Indian state of Tamil Nadu. The headquarters is the town of Denkanikottai. Important places of visit in Thenkanikottai are Yarab Dargah, Bettraya Swamy temple and Little Flower Church. Also The climatic condition in this area resembles the UK Climate, hence nearby place Thally called as "Little England".

Demographics
According to the 2011 census, the taluk of Denkanikottai taluk had a population of 3,45,668 with 1,78,331 males and 1,67,337 females. There were 938 women for every 1,000 men. The taluk had a literacy rate of 57.53%. Child population in the age group below 6 years were 19,219 Males and 17,721 Females.

Places of interest 

 BeterayaSwamyTemple
 Gavi Narashima Swamy Temple
 Panchapalli Dam
 Shivan kovil
 Yarab Dargah
 Bettamugilalam Elephant Forest
 Aiyur Reserve Forest
 Hogenakkal Water Falls(60 km)
 Melagiri Hills
 Little Flower Church
 Cauvery Elephant Reserve
 Thally(The Little England)
 Rayakottai Fort

Villages and settlements
Kodiyalam

References 

Taluks of Krishnagiri district